Grass Indian Reserve No. 15 is an Indian reserve in the area of the City of Chilliwack, British Columbia, Canada, located 3.5 miles southeast of that city's downtown area.  64.80 ha. in size, it is shared by nine bands of the Sto:lo people.  These are :
Aitchelitz First Nation
Kwaw-kwaw-Apilt First Nation
Shxwhá:y Village
Skowkale First Nation
Skwah First Nation
Soowahlie First Nation
Squiala First Nation
Tzeachten First Nation
Yakweakwioose First Nation

See also
List of Indian reserves in British Columbia

References

Indian reserves in the Lower Mainland
Chilliwack
Sto:lo